In the 1912 season of the Campeonato Carioca, two championships were disputed, each by a different league.

AFRJ Championship 

As a punishment for having left the league, Botafogo was forbidden to participate in LMSA's 1912 championship, which led Botafogo to form a rival league to LMSA, the AFRJ (Associação de Football do Rio de Janeiro, or Rio de Janeiro Football Association); However, Botafogo failed in getting the adherence of any of the other LMSA teams, and as such, the league was mostly populated by minor teams that weren't members of that league. To add to that, Botafogo had also fallen under a financial crisis that led it to sell its field in the Voluntários da Pátria street to the city, and thus, Botafogo moved to a field in the São Clemente street, where most of the championship's matches were held.

The edition of the Campeonato Carioca organized by AFRJ kicked off on May 12, 1912 and ended on October 27, 1912. Seven teams participated, including Petropolitano, the first team from outside the city of Rio de Janeiro or Niterói to participate in the Carioca championship. Its participation, which turned out to be their only one, proved to be short, as the team abandoned the league protesting against the rescheduling of their fourth round match against Botafogo. Botafogo won the championship for the 3rd time. no teams were relegated.

Participating teams

System 
The tournament would be disputed in a double round-robin format, with the team with the most points winning the title.

Championship

LMSA Championship 

The edition of the Campeonato Carioca organized by LMSA (Liga Metropolitana de Sports Athleticos, or Metropolitan Athletic Sports League) kicked off on May 3, 1912 and ended on November 1, 1912. Paysandu won the championship for the 1st time. no teams were relegated.

Participating teams 

The league was expanded that year from six to eight teams, with the four participants of the previous year's championship, the three best teams from the second level, and Flamengo, a rowing club that had formed its own football department, mostly comprising former Fluminense players that had a falling out with the club's officialdom in the previous year.

System 
The tournament would be disputed in a double round-robin format, with the team with the most points winning the title.

Championship

References 

Campeonato Carioca seasons
Carioca